The enzyme UDP-glucose 4,6-dehydratase catalyzes the chemical reaction

UDP-glucose  UDP-4-dehydro-6-deoxy-D-glucose + H2O

This enzyme belongs to the family of lyases, specifically the hydro-lyases, which cleave carbon-oxygen bonds.  The systematic name of this enzyme class is UDP-glucose 4,6-hydro-lyase (UDP-4-dehydro-6-deoxy-D-glucose-forming). Other names in common use include UDP-D-glucose-4,6-hydrolyase, UDP-D-glucose oxidoreductase, and UDP-glucose 4,6-hydro-lyase.  This enzyme participates in nucleotide sugars metabolism.

References

 

EC 4.2.1
Enzymes of unknown structure